Corriere Canadese ("The Canadian Courier") is an Italian-language daily newspaper published in Toronto, Ontario, Canada. The publication is distributed exclusively in Ontario and Quebec, primarily throughout the Greater Toronto and the Greater Montreal areas.

Corriere Canadese was founded on 2 June 1954 (Republic Day)  by Dan Iannuzzi, and since 2001 was owned by Multimedia Nova Corporation and published by Italmedia. In 1995, it launched Tandem, an English-language, weekend edition of Corriere Canadese targeting children of Italian immigrants.

The newspaper suspended publication in May 2013 blaming a 2010 cut in subsidies by the Italian government for its financial difficulty. In July, M.T.E.C. Consultants, a group of Italo-Canadian entrepreneurs, acquired the assets of Corriere Canadese and Tandem. The former federal minister Joe Volpe is the new publisher, Francesco Veronesi the new editor in chief.

Corriere published a series of 28 articles by Volpe between October 17, 2020 and January 8, 2021 attacking the Toronto Catholic District School Board and the LGBT YouthLine program, according to the Ontario Superior Court in  The program was removed from the TCDSB website, then reinstated shortly after. Volpe and M.T.E.C. brought a $30 million lawsuit against city councilors Kristyn Wong-Tam and Paul Ainslie, as well as four TCDSB trustees who supported YouthLine, and reporter Elizabeth di Filippo who noted his "well documented anti-LGBTQ+ views." The lawsuit was dismissed as a SLAPP. Volpe and M.T.E.C. were ordered to pay the defendants' legal costs.

See also
List of newspapers in Canada
Media in Toronto
Joe Volpe

References

Italian-Canadian culture
Italian-language newspapers
Newspapers published in Toronto
Multicultural and ethnic newspapers published in Canada
Publications established in 1954
Publications disestablished in 2013
Daily newspapers published in Ontario
1954 establishments in Ontario
2013 disestablishments in Ontario